Elections for the President of the Chamber of Deputies of Romania took place on 23 November 2021. The previous President, Ludovic Orban, elected in 2020, resigned on 13 October 2021 after losing the presidency of the PNL to Florin Cîțu, in the midst of the 2021 Romanian political crisis.

The PSD candidate Marcel Ciolacu, supported by the PNL and the UDMR as part of the then-new parliamentary majority, became the new Chamber president.

Electoral system 
The President of the Chamber of Deputies is elected by secret ballot with the majority of votes of the deputies. If none of the candidates receives the absolute majority of votes, the first two compete again in a second ballot, and the one with most of the votes wins.

Results

References 

2021 elections in Romania
Election of the President of the Chamber of Deputies